Savimbi Neto (born 
3 January 1994), known professionally as Ambush Buzzworl or simply Ambush, is a British rapper from Camden, London. In 2018 the remix to his track "Jumpy", featuring Chip and Skepta, peaked at number 81 on the UK Singles Chart and became a modern-day classic in UK rap. In November his single "Man Can't" reached number 85 on the same chart. In December, Complex ranked the "Jumpy" remix as the UK's best song of 2018. Ambush is also considered to be underrated in the eyes of several fans.

References 

 

Rappers from London
English male rappers
UK drill musicians
Gangsta rappers
Living people
People from the London Borough of Camden
1994 births